Condrò (Sicilian: Cundrò) is a comune (municipality) in the Metropolitan City of Messina in the Italian region Sicily, located about  east of Palermo and about  west of Messina.

Condrò borders the following municipalities: Gualtieri Sicaminò, Pace del Mela, San Pier Niceto.

References 

Cities and towns in Sicily